Grapeland is a historic plantation home located near Wardtown, Northampton County, Virginia. It was built about 1825, and is a two-story, three-bay, gable-roofed, Federal style brick house.  It has a one-story, brick wing added in the mid-19th century.  Also on the property are the contributing four-bay, frame kitchen building with a central chimney and an early 19th-century frame stable.

It was listed on the National Register of Historic Places in 1980.

References

Houses on the National Register of Historic Places in Virginia
Federal architecture in Virginia
Houses completed in 1825
Houses in Northampton County, Virginia
National Register of Historic Places in Northampton County, Virginia
1825 establishments in Virginia